The County of Bute, also known as Buteshire, is a historic county and registration county of Scotland.

The county comprises a number of islands in the Firth of Clyde, between the counties of Argyll and Ayrshire, the principal islands being Bute, Arran, Great Cumbrae and Little Cumbrae. The county town is Rothesay, located on the Isle of Bute. Buteshire had its own elected county council from 1890 to 1975.

History

Buteshire was created as a shire (the area administered by a sheriff) by Robert II around 1385. Prior to that the islands in the Firth of Clyde had not formed part of any shire. The position of Sheriff of Bute was initially given to Robert's illegitimate son, John Stewart, and subsequently passed to John's descendants, who became the Earls of Bute in 1703.

Inherited sheriffdoms were abolished by the Heritable Jurisdictions (Scotland) Act 1746, after which sheriffs were appointed by the crown. The Sheriffs (Scotland) Act 1747 then placed Buteshire under a joint sheriff with neighbouring Argyll.

Meanwhile, in 1667 Commissioners of Supply were established for each shire, which would serve as the main administrative body for the area until the creation of county councils in 1890. Elected county councils were created in 1890 under the Local Government (Scotland) Act 1889, taking most of the functions of the Commissioners of Supply. Bute County Council was based at the Rothesay Town Hall and County Buildings at 31 High Street in Rothesay, which had been built in 1835 and served as the meeting place for Rothesay Town Council and the Commissioners of Supply, as well as being the courthouse for Buteshire.

Buteshire was abolished for local government purposes in 1975 under the Local Government (Scotland) Act 1973, which replaced Scotland's counties, burghs and landward districts, with upper-tier regions and lower-tier districts. Buteshire was included in the Strathclyde region, with the Isle of Bute being placed in the Argyll and Bute district, and the Isle of Arran and the Cumbraes being placed in Cunninghame district. Strathclyde region was abolished in 1996 when the regions and districts were replaced by unitary council areas, with Argyll and Bute becoming a council area, and Cunninghame being renamed to become the North Ayrshire council area.

Buteshire's historic boundaries are still used for some limited official purposes connected with land registration, being a registration county.

Geography

Buteshire consists of two main islands in the Firth of Clyde separated by the Sound of Bute - Arran (also including the much smaller Holy Island, Hamilton Isle and Pladda off the south-east coast) and Bute (including the small isle of Inchmarnock off its west coast) - and also the Cumbraes between Bute and Ayrshire on the mainland, comprising Great Cumbrae, Little Cumbrae and the islets of The Eileans, Broad Islands, Castle Island and Trail Island.

Arran is Scotland's 7th largest island and is a popular tourist destination, often referred to as 'Scotland in miniature' due to the wide variety of scenery and geographical features that can be found here. The island is roughly peanut-shaped, being flatter in the south and more mountainous in the north, culminating in Goat Fell, the tallest mountain in Buteshire at 874 metres (2,866 ft). It is separated from the Kintyre peninsula by Kilbrannan Sound. Bute is in contrast is a much flatter though somewhat hilly island, especially in the north; it is separated from the Cowal peninsula by the narrow Kyles of Bute. A number of lochs lie in the centre of the island, most notably Loch Fad, Loch Quien and Loch Ascog.

Transport
Bute is connected by ferry to Wemyss Bay on the mainland; a ferry also connects the island with the Cowal peninsula from the north-east of the island. An A-road runs along Bute's east coast and loops around the island's southern half; the northern half of the island is less well-served and can mostly only by traversed by foot or bike. Arran is also connected to the Scottish mainland by ferry; from the north one can reach Tarbert and Claonaig in Kintyre, and from Rothesay ferries depart for Ardrossan in Ayrshire and Campbeltown further down the Kintyre peninsula. A road goes around the edge of the island, with a B road cutting east–west across. A ferry also connects Great Cumbrae with Largs in Ayrshire.

Parliamentary constituency 
There was a Buteshire constituency of the House of Commons of the Parliament of Great Britain from 1708 to 1800 and of the Parliament of the United Kingdom from 1801 to 1918. Between 1708 and 1832 it was an alternating constituency with Caithness: one constituency elected a Member of Parliament (MP) to one parliament then the other elected an MP to the next. Between 1832 and 1918 it was a separate constituency, electing an MP to every parliament.

The population of Buteshire in 1841 was 15,740.

In 1918 the constituency was combined with the Ayrshire North constituency to form the Bute and Northern Ayrshire constituency, a constituency which straddled the boundary between the local government counties of Bute and Ayrshire.

In 1983, eight years after Scottish local government counties had been abolished, the Bute and Northern Ayrshire constituency was divided between the Argyll and Bute constituency and the Cunninghame North constituency.

In 2005, both constituencies were enlarged as part of the Fifth Periodic Review of Westminster constituencies. The name "Argyll and Bute" was retained, while the enlarged Cunningham North was named North Ayrshire and Arran.

Constituencies with similar boundaries to the pre-2005 constituencies, and also called Argyll and Bute and Cunninghame North, are used by the Scottish Parliament.

Civil parishes
 North Bute
 Rothesay
 Kingarth
 Cumbraes or Great Cumbrae
 Kilbride, Arran 
 Kilmory, Arran
 Lochranza

List of places
Towns and places in Buteshire include:

Arran
Blackwaterfoot
Brodick
Catacol
Cladach
Corrie
Corriegills, Arran
Dippen
Kildonan
Kilmory
Kings Cross, Arran
Lagg
Lamlash
Lochranza
Machrie
Pirnmill
Sannox
Shiskine
Sliddery
Whitefarland
Whiting Bay

Bute
Ardbeg
Cladach
Kilchattan Bay
Kingarth
Port Bannatyne
Rhubodach
Rothesay

The Cumbraes
Millport

Gallery

See also
List of counties of Scotland 1890–1975

References

External links
 
NLS map of Buteshire. John Thompson's Atlas of Scotland. 1832.

 
Former counties of Scotland
Counties of the United Kingdom (1801–1922)